The Day to Mark the Departure and Expulsion of Jews from the Arab Countries and Iran (Hebrew: יוֹם לְצִיּוֹן הָיְצִיאָה וְהַגִירוּשׁ שֶׁל הַיְהוּדִים מֵאַרְצוֹת עֲרָב וּמְאִירָאן Yōm ləṢīyyōn haYəṣīʾā vəhaGīrūš šel haYəhūdīm məʾArṣōt ʿĂrāv ūməʾĪrāʾn) is a Memorial Day that is marked in Israel every year starting in 2014, on November 30 with the purpose of marking the departure and expulsion of Jews from Arab countries and Iran. November 30 is the date that was chosen since it is symbolically the day following November 29, a day the United Nations Partition Plan for Palestine was adopted, and when many communities of Jews in Arab countries and Iran started to feel the pressure and hostility from their Arab and Persian neighbors and as a result of that were forced to leave their countries. It is based on a law sponsored by MK Shimon Ohayon (Yisrael Beiteinu) and passed in the summer of 2014 by the Knesset.

For many Mizrahi Jews in Israel it is considered to be a belated recognition of their collective trauma.

Memorialization in Israel
On May 9, 2021, the first physical memorialization in Israel of the Departure and Expulsion of Jews from Arab lands and Iran was placed on the Sherover Promenade in Jerusalem.

The text on the Memorial reads;

"With the birth of the State of Israel, over 850,000
Jews were forced from Arab Lands and Iran.
The desperate refugees were welcomed by Israel.

By Act of the Knesset: Nov. 30, annually, is the
Departure and Expulsion Memorial Day.
Memorial donated by the Jewish American Society for Historic Preservation,
With support from the World Sephardi Federation, City of Jerusalem and the Jerusalem Foundation"

The sculpture is the interpretive work of Sam Philipe, a fifth generation Jerusalemite.

See also
Day of Revenge
Jewish exodus from Arab and Muslim countries
Mizrahi Jews in Israel
Nakba Day

References

Mizrahi Jewish culture in Israel
Remembrance days
Public holidays in Israel
Refugees in Africa
History of the Jews in the Middle East
Mass media about the Arab–Israeli conflict
Israeli people of Mizrahi descent
November observances
Jewish exodus from Arab and Muslim countries
Autumn events in Israel
Refugees in Asia